Thomas Bernard "Barney" McCabe (15 January 1903 – 1963) was an English professional footballer who played as an inside right. He made appearances in the English Football League for Darlington, York City and Wrexham.

References

1903 births
1963 deaths
English footballers
Association football forwards
English Football League players
Darlington F.C. players
Ferryhill Athletic F.C. players
Newcastle United F.C. players
Spennymoor United F.C. players
York City F.C. players
Wigan Athletic F.C. players
Wrexham A.F.C. players
Burton Town F.C. players
Worcester City F.C. players
Stourbridge F.C. players